Manggarai Station (MRI) is a railway station at Manggarai, Tebet in  Jakarta, Indonesia. At present, it serves primarily as a transit station for Greater Jakarta Commuterline and Soekarno–Hatta Airport Rail Link; however the station will replace Gambir as the terminus for most intercity trains in 2025. The Bukit Duri depot is located in south of the Manggarai station.

History

20th century 

The region of Manggarai has already known since the 17th century. It is the residence and market for slaves from Manggarai, Flores which later developed into Gementee Meester Cornelis.  Although the Batavia—Buitenzorg line was built by the Nederlands-Indische Spoorweg Maatschappij (NIS) in 1873, Manggarai Station was built in 1914 and completed on 1 May 1918.

The construction was not fully finished when it was first opened — World War I in Europe delayed the delivery of certain parts of its roof. Its tracks branched to Meester Cornelis (Jatinegara) and continued to Bandung and also to Tanah Abang. The construction was supervised by Van Grendt, who also designed the railway education school building and official residences for employees around the station area. The first class waiting room has not changed since the 1910s. The station replaced the second Meester Cornelis Station, which was located a few hundred meters to the south.

This station witnessed the struggle of the Indonesian people, namely on January 3, 1946, when the extraordinary train (Kereta Luar Biasa KLB) transported the entourage of President Sukarno to the city of Yogyakarta. Secret preparations were made. Rows of freight carriages were placed on line 1. At around seven o'clock in the evening, KLB passed very slowly from the direction of Pegangsaan through line 4.

Central Station Development 
On August 12, 2016, PT. KAI Commuter Jabodetabek together with the fans of KRL Commuterline held a discussion on the Manggarai Station development plan. To answer the complaints of Commuterline's passenger queue, which continues to increase every year, the completion of the Cikarang – Manggarai double-double track is being accelerated. In addition, this station will be made multi-storey which can accommodate long-distance trains and KRL Commuter Line with their respective lines. This station is expected to become the central station for the KRL Commuter Line and also the terminus for the Soekarno–Hatta Airport Rail Link.

Later, the Directorate General of Railways began to renovate this station in 2017 by adding a new building with a modern minimalist futuristic architecture to three floors—the first floor of the station is the emplacement of the KRL Commuter Line and the airport KRL, the second floor is a place for providing passenger facilities, kiosk (commercial area), and the 3rd floor is used for KRL Commuterline stops and also long-distance trains to outside Jakarta. The old station building, a legacy of Staatsspoorwegen, will be maintained because of its status as a cultural heritage. With the completion of the Manggarai Station project as a central station, it is planned that all long and medium-distance passenger trains with a terminus at Gambir Station will be moved to Manggarai Station.

To accommodate the Soekano–Hatta Airport Rail Link service, the trip which originally only served the Sudirman Baru/BNI City route—Soekarno-Hatta Airport was extended to Manggarai—Soekarno-Hatta Airport—previously it was extended to Bekasi—Soekarno-Hatta Airport for several months. With the completion of the Airport Train building, Manggarai Station has officially served the Airport KRL passengers since October 5, 2019.

Naming rights 
As an innovation in optimizing its assets, KAI offers a naming rights program. This program was re-run after being last implemented at BNI City Station in 2018 and Metland Telagamurni Station in 2019. Through this program, brands from partners who enter into contracts can be applied to various aspects of KAI media including signage, wayfinding, maps track, to announcements both at the station and on the train.

KAI targets the phase 1 station naming rights program to be completed this year. Therefore, on September 20, 2022, KAI held an Exclusive Meeting Gathering for potential partners at Hotel Mulia, Jakarta.  For phase 1, naming rights are offered to Manggarai Station and several other stations in Jakarta, including Pasar Senen, Jatinegara, Tanah Abang, Tebet, Cikini, Sudirman, Juanda, Gondangdia, and Palmerah Station.

Building and layout 
Manggarai Station also functions as a storage area for large trains with a train depot. Many executive, business, and economy class trains are stored in depots to be sent to Pasar Senen Station and Gambir Station to serve passengers.

Adjacent to the depot and station building is the Manggarai Railway workshop, which is a workshop for routine maintenance and repair of passenger trains. The Bukit Duri depot is located near the station, it is a place for storing and daily maintenance of various electric trains. Initially, this depot also kept diesel locomotives, but all of them were moved to depots in Cipinang and Tanah Abang.

Initially, Manggarai Station had nine train lines that were used for KRL stops plus one line each for transit to the Train Affairs Supervisor, Bukit Duri Depot, as well as to Manggarai Railway Workshop. Lines 1 and 2 are used to stop Cikarang Line. Lines 3 and 4 are used as straight lines for long-distance trains as well as for the Cikarang Line stop.  Line 5-7 is used for the Central Line (Bogor line) stop. Lines 8 and 9 are used to stop the Soekarno–Hatta Airport Rail Link.

As of September 25, 2021, the first phase of development for this station has been completed.  The development is in the form of a new multi-storey building that was built on the west side of the station along with the upper line consisting of four railway lines so that the number of station lines has increased to thirteen lines.  Simultaneously, the Central Line service was renamed to Bogor Line and the line was transferred to the upper line of Manggarai Station which was numbered lines 10 to 13. Lines 10 and 11 were turn and straight tracks for the KRL stop for the Jakarta Kota direction, while  Lines 12 and 13 are straight and turn tracks, respectively, for the KRL stop for the direction of Bogor.  In addition, access to the platform through the main door on the west side of the station is also integrated with TransJakarta via the Manggarai BRT Station.

Since the operational of the KRL Commuterline, this station has become increasingly congested.  This is evidenced by the large number of up and down passengers, as well as many international franchise restaurant and shop companies that have opened branches here.

Facilities and Development 

Manggarai Station is not just a station, it is also as a parking place for intercity trains before the trains transfer to Gambir Station or Jakarta Kota Station for their departure. The station is also the terminus of the Soekarno-Hatta Airport Rail Link express and commuter train service.

At present the station is undergoing development with a three-level station. It is planned that there will be 8 railways lanes on the ground floor, which will be used by Bekasi line of Greater Jakarta Commuter Railway and Airport rail. Meanwhile, on the second floor there will be 10 railway tracks, which will serve long-distance trains and Bogor line of metro rail. After completion, Manggarai prepared to be the largest transit station, not only for metro rail, but also the starting point for departure of long-distance trains and Soekarno-Hatta Airport Trains. There will be a housing and commercial complex, and a 5 star hotel also surrounding the station.

Train Services
The following is a list of train services at the Manggarai Station.

Passenger services

KAI Commuter

Airport Rail Link

Supporting transportation

Incidents 
On June 24, 2022, a passenger on the KRL Commuter Line fell under the platform. It is said that the passenger fell when the passenger was about to enter KRL 5551 on the Cikarang – Kampung Bandan relation on the platform of line 6-7 of Manggarai Station. This triggered panic among all passengers at Manggarai Station considering the train was passing when the victim fell. Luckily, the victim survived and was immediately taken to the Station Health Post to be given first aid. After being treated at the health post and confirming that the passenger's health condition is good, the passenger resumed its journey using the KRL. 

On July 8, 2022, two weeks after the previous incident, a child fell under the platform of Line 6 at Manggarai Station while boarding the KRL TM 6000 New Livery along with the child's mother and young sister. Luckily, the child was immediately rescued by the Internal Security Officer (PKD), it was suspected that the child had fallen due to the full capacity of the train as a result of the adjustment after the route change.

Gallery

References

Footnotes

Citations

External links

south Jakarta
Railway stations in Jakarta
Railway stations opened in 1918
Colonial architecture in Jakarta